Udea praefulvalis is a moth in the family Crambidae. It was described by Hans Georg Amsel in 1970 and is found in Afghanistan.

References

praefulvalis
Moths described in 1970